Vicky Featherstone (born 5 April 1967) is a theatre and artistic director. She has been artistic director of London's Royal Court Theatre since April 2013. Prior to that she was founding artistic director of the National Theatre of Scotland, and before that artistic director of the UK new writing touring theatre company Paines Plough. Her career has been characterised by significant involvement with new writing.

Early life and career
Featherstone was born in Redhill, Surrey but moved to Scotland at 6 weeks old, where she lived in Clackmannanshire until the age of 7, when her father's work took her around the world. Her father is a chemical engineer and her mother a nurse. She is the eldest of three children. Featherstone was privately educated.

Featherstone studied Drama at Manchester University, and soon discovered she favoured directing over acting. "I really realised, very quickly, that what I wanted to be was a director, because I'm not a very good actor, and I saw people who were incredible actors, but what I was really excited about was the bigger picture, and the overall-- and putting something together," she said in 2011. After her initial degree, Featherstone also did an MA in Directing at the University, in association with Manchester's Contact Theatre.

Professional theatre
Featherstone's first work in professional theatre followed, as an assistant director at the Royal Court in 1990 on Martin Crimp's No One Sees the Video. She gained a place on the Regional Theatre Young Director Scheme, under which she spent two years from 1992 to 1994, first as Assistant Director and then Associate Director, based at West Yorkshire Playhouse, then under the artistic directorship of Jude Kelly. She then became resident director at the Octagon Theatre Bolton from 1994 to 1996 and worked at Northern Stage, then became Literary Associate for the Bush Theatre from 1996 to 1997.

Television script editor
In the mid-1990s, Featherstone returned to TV script editing and programme development, having worked for a time as a script editor for Central TV immediately after University. Whilst a script editor at United Productions, Featherstone conceived, after attending a friend's wedding in Yorkshire, with writer Ashley Pharoah, the series Where the Heart Is, revolving around the lives of district nurses in a close-knit Yorkshire community. The programme debuted in 1997. She was also involved in the development of the pathologist drama Silent Witness, first broadcast in 1996, for which she was credited as script editor for the first two episodes.

Paines Plough Artistic Director
Featherstone was artistic director of Paines Plough, a theatre company based in the UK that specialises in new plays and touring, from 1997 to 2004.

Immediately prior to her appointment, the company was not thriving. Early on, Featherstone appointed writers Mark Ravenhill as literary manager and Sarah Kane as writer-in-residence, and developed an atmosphere seen as welcoming to writers. Within two years of her appointment, the company had increased audiences by over 100%. World premieres of Anna Weiss, a study of false memory syndrome by Mike Cullen, Crave, written by Kane on love and loss, Sleeping Around, a 1990s update of La Ronde, and The Cosmonaut's Last Message to the Woman He Once Loved in the Former Soviet Union by David Greig, helped build Paines Plough's reputation.

Under Featherstone the company was noted for its commitment to theatrical activity outside London in the UK regions, and willingness to experiment and collaborate with other theatre companies such as Frantic Assembly and Graeae. Her hiring of John Tiffany as associate director was also considered a significant contribution to the company's success.

By the time of Featherstone's departure from Paines Plough in 2004, the company was being described as "a major force for new writing" and "a national and international force in British theatre", staff had doubled from four to eight, she had turned round the company's deficit and turnover had risen to £0.5m per year.

National Theatre of Scotland Artistic Director and Chief Executive
After Scottish devolution in 1997, long-discussed plans for a national theatre for Scotland began to come to fruition. In 2000, the Scottish Executive invited the Scottish Arts Council (SAC) to conduct a feasibility study into a Scottish national theatre, and an SAC independent working group subsequently reported in May 2001. The model for a National Theatre of Scotland (NTS) that was resolved upon was a commissioning theatre, a "theatre without walls", with no need for a new theatre building or a permanent company of actors, but making use of existing theatre buildings, actors and technical staff to create new work to be staged in venues throughout Scotland and internationally.

In September 2003, the Scottish Executive announced confirmed funding of £7.5m for the establishment of the NTS, with £3.5m for the year April 2004 to March 2005 and £4m for the following year. Robert Findlay, once chief executive of Scottish Radio Holdings, was appointed as chairman, and once a board had also been appointed, the search for the first artistic director for the NTS began.

Featherstone's appointment
The job of Director of the NTS, to combine the roles of director, chief executive and artistic director, was advertised in May 2004. NTS chairman Findlay said at the time, "We want someone of clearly outstanding ability. Now it's possible that person will not be working in Scotland at the moment, and then again they may very well be." He also said that the new director would have to be an outstanding individual. "We are looking for a genius," he said. "We need somebody who has wide experience of theatre production, development and nurturing new writing as well as good administrative and financial skills. We are casting the net wide." The person specification for the job identified an Artistic Director who, amongst other things, was "a visionary, with.... the ability to bring together diverse talents to create something very special".

Featherstone read the advertisement for the post. "I thought the vocabulary of the board was fascinating. I thought they spoke the language of true creativity. It was radical, it was challenging. I applied," she recalled in August 2004. From an initial 30 applications for the post to run the NTS, a short-list of six directors was interviewed.

In 2011, Featherstone reflected: "when this job came up, I'd been running a small-scale touring company up to that point, and actually, the National Theatre of Scotland is just a large scale touring company – Paines Plough – and I'd been running that company, and so I just kind of imagined what I would do, if that company had a national responsibility". Comments Featherstone made soon after her appointment also indicated her thoughts of what the NTS should be. "I want to make the experience something that audiences benefit from, that makes people want urgently to go to the theatre. It has to be work that is remarkable and life-enhancing, and it has to be about setting high standards with the first big plays," she said in August 2004. "I see it as my responsibility to put the most exciting work on stage that I possibly can. ... Some of it will be new, but we will do classic plays if they have a new spin on them, plays that will tour around Scotland and be strong enough to tour internationally." Nonetheless, the focus would be local. "This is my vision," she said. "I want the scale of show that Britain today rarely exports. But I think the place to start is home. I believe good theatre in Scotland should explore the psyche of the nation, and when that work is created well, it will be universal." Working with Scotland's existing theatre community would be "about finding ways of putting people together to come up with ideas, and then supporting those ideas, making a series of connections that create chemistry." Featherstone retrospectively summarised her vision for the NTS in 2012, "For me, when I started, the task was to prove Scotland could create and sustain an outward-looking, modern, contemporary national theatre, and that is what my task was."

Findlay announced Featherstone's appointment on 29 July 2004 at the Royal Scottish Academy of Music and Drama. Her English background did not concern the appointment board. "We were looking for someone who was the best person to take Scottish theatre forward – Romanian, English, we weren't concerned," Findlay said. "Everything she said struck a chord with us. Her ideas were exciting and vibrant. We wanted someone with an international dimension. I think we've got that." Featherstone said: "This is a life-changing moment for me personally, I also believe for theatre, and for Scotland. So many people have put years of thinking, work, ideas, discussion, pain and ambition into this idea. I carry on my shoulders the weight of these ambitions and these ideas and I promise I will not let any of you down." She added: "I am honoured to be charged with the historic responsibility of developing and achieving the founding vision for the National Theatre of Scotland. The company will build upon all that is vibrant, dynamic and ground-breaking in Scotland and the Scottish theatre scene, to create life-changing theatre for all to enjoy", and said she intended to produce "exciting epic productions, state-of-the-nation productions, which will make us proud to be alive".

Building the organisation
Featherstone took up her post at the NTS – then housed in an empty temporary office in Hope Street, Glasgow on 1 November 2004. She later recalled: "There was a 'zero' moment – walking into my office with my mobile phone and a Muji notebook, no furniture and a copy of The Herald. I was sitting on the floor, reading the paper, with my notebook, and thinking: 'I have got to start a national theatre.'"

Featherstone began building a team. This included John Tiffany, who had worked with her at Paines Plough and prior to that was Literary Director of Edinburgh's Traverse Theatre, as Associate Director of New Work; Neil Murray, since 1999 executive producer of Glasgow's Tron Theatre, as the NTS's Executive Director; playwright David Greig, as dramaturg ("He will be discussing plays, suggesting plays, working with international writers, helping set up translations and looking at ways we can work on existing Scottish plays," Featherstone said); playwright and poet Liz Lochhead as an artistic associate; and Simon Sharkey, then artistic director of Cumbernauld Theatre, as associate director of NTS Learn (set up to foster and support a culture of creative learning throughout Scotland embedded in all areas of the NTS's work and programme, to "open up great theatre experiences to as many people as possible across Scotland").

Featherstone and the team undertook intensive engagement with theatre professionals and groups throughout Scotland and began developing ideas and strategy. In late 2005, Featherstone commented, "I have spent many hours debating the notion of a 'national theatre' and the responsibility that entails. It is not, and should not be, a jingoistic, patriotic stab at defining a nation's identity through theatre. In fact, it should not be an opportunity to try to define anything. Instead, it is the chance to throw open the doors of possibility, to encourage boldness. I hope our programme goes some way to realising these ambitions. I hope we will make Scotland proud."

National Theatre of Scotland's inaugural season
On 2 November 2005, Featherstone unveiled the National Theatre of Scotland's inaugural programme to a packed audience at the Tramway in Glasgow, having announced it the previous day. The season included ten first night shows on the theme of Home, Black Watch scheduled for August 2006, and various other productions.

Home
"We spent a long time thinking of how to present our opening night and finally came up with 'Home'", Featherstone commented the week before launch. "We asked 10 of our best directors to create a piece of theatre around the word 'Home' – commonly thought of as one of the most evocative words in the English language." She added: "We could have opened with a well-known play, in one of the well-known theatres in the central belt, with a famous actor on stage, but we felt this historic moment warranted something more epic, more unusual and, importantly, we have all the time in the world to do great productions like that in the months and years to come. We want people to realise the NTS relates to the people of Scotland and for people to feel that they have ownership of it. We have an opportunity to define what theatre, or a national theatre, can and should be."

"No single piece of theatre in a single venue should have to take the responsibility of defining or of being the opening night for the NTS," she said. "So we thought, 'What is the opposite of that?' The opposite is about ten directors, it is about taking a word, 'Home', which can be domestic or political and creating a work that is all over Scotland, so it has resonance for all the communities it is in. We are not setting up some kind of elite theatre that you will hear about that took place in Edinburgh for 20 nights. This is about saying this really is your national theatre and we want you to be a part of it."

The 10 experimental site-specific shows were staged simultaneously in non-theatre locations all across Scotland, with an "official first night" of 25 February 2006. Each production was allocated a budget of £60,000, and up to 10,000 free tickets were available.

In 2008, Featherstone reflected: "Home was an early statement of intent. We wanted to cut through all the stultifying speculation as to what the first production would be, who would be in it, where it would be, and instead give 10 directors the opportunity to create theatre across the whole of Scotland. It required everyone involved to step outside their comfort zone, something which has been a constant and sometimes terrifying trademark of our existence so far."

Black Watch

Triggered by an article she read in the Glasgow Herald shortly after she took up her appointment with the NTS in November 2004, Featherstone asked writer Gregory Burke to follow the unfolding story of the Black Watch regiment – the oldest Highland regiment, which was being merged with other Scottish regiments. The production, about a group of young soldiers from the Fife-based regiment in Basra, was developed from interviews Burke did one Sunday afternoon in a pub in Dunfermline with six soldiers who had served in Iraq. This was developed into loosely connected scenes and ultimately the finished play.

Directed by Tiffany, Black Watch opened as part of the Edinburgh Festival Fringe in August 2006, as a site-specific work performed at the University of Edinburgh's Drill hall. The play was an immediate popular and critical success. The production subsequently won multiple awards including Olivier Awards, has toured repeatedly since with productions on five continents, and has been adapted for television by the BBC.

Featherstone's response to the play's success recognises its contribution to the National Theatre of Scotland's brand. In 2007, writing in the introduction to the published edition of the script, Featherstone commented: "If the non-building-based model of the NTS can create something so universal, so powerful and so pertinent, we really do have the opportunity here to create a cultural landmark. Not a monument to the past, but rather a breathing, flexible, challenging and bold movement for the future." "I feel relieved we have Black Watch and I adore it," she said in 2012, reflecting on her tenure at the NTS. "I have never felt insecure that we are the company that made Black Watch – I would rather that than people not knowing who we were. It is an extraordinary piece of theatre. Every time I see it I think, 'God, it is still ahead of its time.' But even more than that, the visceral effect it has on the audience reaffirms theatre again and again."

Royal Court Artistic Director
Featherstone's appointment as artistic director of the Royal Court was announced in May 2012 and she took over in April 2013.

Personal life
Featherstone is married to Danny Brown, a TV scriptwriter and former stand-up comedian. They have two children, a son (born around 1999) and a daughter (born around 2001).

Theatre productions directed

External links

References

English artistic directors
English theatre directors
Living people
1967 births
People from Redhill, Surrey
People educated at the Old Palace School